Yuliya Artyomovna Kanakina (born 11 December 1995) is a Russian skeleton racer who competes on the Skeleton World Cup circuit. She began international competition in 2011, and was promoted to the World Cup squad in the 2014–15 season. Before starting skeleton, Kanakina was a ballet dancer. She was the IBSF Junior World Champion in women's skeleton for 2017 in Sigulda, and finished 26th in the senior IBSF World Championships later that year. In 2018, Kanakina took silver at the Junior World Championships, 0.81 seconds behind Anna Fernstädt.

World Cup results
All results are sourced from the International Bobsleigh and Skeleton Federation (IBSF).

References

External links
 

1995 births
Russian female skeleton racers
Living people
Sportspeople from Krasnoyarsk
Skeleton racers at the 2022 Winter Olympics
Olympic skeleton racers of Russia
20th-century Russian women
21st-century Russian women